Vladimir Kopat (born 23 April 1971) is a Belarusian ice hockey player. He competed in the men's tournament at the 2002 Winter Olympics.

Career statistics

Regular season and playoffs

International

References

External links

1971 births
Living people
Olympic ice hockey players of Belarus
Ice hockey players at the 2002 Winter Olympics
Ice hockey people from Minsk